Wentz is a surname. Notable people with the surname include:

 Barney Wentz, American football player
 Carson Wentz, American football player
 Earl Wentz, American composer and pianist
 Eiji Wentz, Japanese singer for the band WaT
 Elisabet Wentz-Janacek (1923-2014) Swedish author and composer
 Janet Wentz, American politician
 Joey Wentz, American baseball player
 Lewis Haines Wentz, American oil businessman
 Pete Wentz, American bassist for the band Fall Out Boy, owner of the (discontinued) fashion line Clandestine Industries, author of the novel Gray
 Siegfried Wentz, German track and field athlete
 Zachary Wentz, American professional wrestler
 Walter Evans-Wentz, American anthropologist

See also 
 Wenz (disambiguation)
 Wenzel, Wentzel, Wenzl

German-language surnames
Surnames from given names